Hurricane High School may refer to:

 Hurricane High School (Utah)
 Hurricane High School (West Virginia)